Chrząstawa Mała  is a village in the administrative district of Gmina Czernica, within Wrocław County, Lower Silesian Voivodeship, in south-western Poland. Prior to 1945 it was in Germany.

Since March 2012, in the village operates a brewpub Widawa, elected of microbrewery year 2012 in a poll of the Bractwo Piwne.

References

Villages in Wrocław County